Robert Troha (born 28 June 1977) is a retired Croatian professional basketball player. Known for his shooting skills, Troha was forced to retire in 2011 due to serious knee problems.

External links
 Adriatic League Profile 
 Robert Troha potpisao za Cibonu 
 Troha zatražio raskid s Cibonom zbog dugova iz prošle sezone 

1977 births
Living people
ABA League players
Croatian men's basketball players
KK Cedevita players
KK Cibona players
KK Gorica players
Basketball players from Zagreb
KK Zrinjevac players
Small forwards
Shooting guards
Helios Suns players